Web Therapy is an improvised online series starring Lisa Kudrow as Fiona Wallice, a therapist who has conceived of a new form of therapy, the titular "web therapy". The series debuted on LStudio.com on September 22, 2008.

Synopsis
Fiona Wallice is a therapist who has conceived of a new "modality" of therapy: the titular "web therapy". In her estimation, the traditional "50-minute hour" version of therapy gives people too much leeway to talk about irrelevant things. By dramatically shortening session time, she hopes to get results more quickly. Her sessions take place via webcam over the internet using Skype. They are taped in the hope of attracting investors into promoting her new technique as a worldwide therapy option.

A dark comedy, much of the humor revolves around Fiona's obvious self-interest and how it overshadows her legitimate ability to determine people's issues quickly and effectively. (For instance, in "Sibling Ribaldry," she manages to completely clarify a couple's romantic emotional issues in thirty seconds but does so only to bring them around so she can then film them discussing more trivial sexual issues that are more shocking.)

TV series

In April 2010, Showtime announced plans to adapt the online episodes for broadcast on television with extra scenes being shot. The series premiered on Showtime on July 19, 2011, and ran for 10 episodes. In December 2011, Showtime renewed Web Therapy for a second season of 11 episodes, which premiered on July 2, 2012. On November 16, 2012, Web Therapy was renewed for a 10 episode third season by Showtime. On January 14, 2014, Showtime renewed Web Therapy for a fourth season, that ran for 12 episodes. On August 11, 2015, Showtime cancelled the series after four seasons.

Awards and nominations

Guest stars
The series has featured appearances by a number of prominent comedians and actors including Julia Louis-Dreyfus, Bob Balaban, Rashida Jones, Selma Blair, Tim Bagley, Dan Bucatinsky, Jane Lynch, Molly Shannon, Lily Tomlin, Rosie O'Donnell, Conan O'Brien, Craig Ferguson, Alan Cumming, Natasha Bedingfield, Minnie Driver, Courteney Cox and Darren Criss. Oscar-winning actress Meryl Streep guest starred in three special episodes that were made after the third series had been completed. It was announced on the show's Facebook page that guest stars for the second series will include Selma Blair, David Schwimmer and Victor Garber.

Lisa Kudrow's connection to guest stars
Courteney Cox
Former main cast member on Friends and star of Cougar Town on which Lisa Kudrow guest starred and also is a good friend.
Dan Bucatinsky
Production partner and former cast member on The Comeback.
Bob Balaban
Guest star on Friends (he played Phoebe Buffay's father).
Drew Sherman
Played the cameraman (Dan) in a The Comeback featurette.
Alan Cumming
Co-star in Romy and Michele's High School Reunion.
Meryl Streep
Both alumnae of Vassar College, where they both currently serve on the board of trustees.
David Schwimmer
Former main cast member and director on Friends and Schwimmer is a good friend of Kudrow.
 Matt LeBlanc
 Former main cast member on Friends and LeBlanc is a good friend of Kudrow.
Matthew Perry
 Former main cast member on Friends and Perry is a good friend of Kudrow.

See also
List of Web Therapy webisodes
Cyberpsychology
Online counseling

References

External links
 Official website LATAM
 Internet Movie Database
 Volmers, Eric (June 16, 2011). "The evolution of Lisa Kudrow: Friends star finds success in online show Web Therapy. Ottawa Citizen. Retrieved June 19, 2011.

2008 web series debuts
American comedy web series
Internet properties established in 2008
Television series created by Lisa Kudrow